Creighton University School of Law, located in Omaha, Nebraska, United States, is a component of the Jesuit Creighton University. According to Creighton's official 2019 ABA-required disclosures, 75% of the Class of 2019 obtained full-time, long-term, JD-advantaged or JD-required employment nine months after graduation.

History
In 1904, the School of Law began as a joint project with the Omaha Bar Association, with Timothy J. Mahoney as the first dean. The School of Law was housed in the Edward Creighton Institute on S. 18th Street until 1921, when it moved to new quarters on the Creighton campus.

Admissions
The middle 50% range of LSAT scores of the full-time Fall 2018 entering class was 150–156. In this class, the male to female ratio is 51 percent to 49 percent, respectively. 19 percent of this class is a minority.

Scholarships
Creighton Law offers multiple types of scholarships to incoming first-year law students, as well as scholarships to returning second- and third-year law students. Examples include the Dean's Academic Scholarship, and the Frances M. Ryan Diversity Scholarship. 73% of the 2018 entering class received a scholarship.

Programs
The majority of Creighton School of Law students are enrolled in a full-time Juris Doctor program, which takes three years to complete. A growing number of students are enrolled in the Accelerated JD program, which takes two years to complete. A small portion of the student body is enrolled in a part-time JD program, which takes approximately four years to complete.

Concentrations and joint degrees
Creighton School of Law offers six certificates and four joint degrees. The certificates are Health Law, Family Law, Business, Commercial and Tax Law; Criminal Law and Procedure, International and Comparative Law, and Litigation. The joint degree programs include the law 3/3 program with its BSBA/JD degree (the completion of an undergraduate degree and a JD in six years instead of seven), the MBA/JD degree, the JD/MS in Government Organization and Leadership (GOAL), and the JD/MS in Negotiation and Conflict Resolution.

Clinics
Creighton operates the Milton R. Abrahams Clinic, which offers free legal assistance on civil matters to low-income residents of Douglas County. Starting in the Fall of 2017, the Creighton Immigrant and Refugee Clinic, housed within the Milton R. Abrahams Clinic, offers support to immigrant and refugees and is run in cooperation with the Immigrant Legal Center (formerly known as Justice for Our Neighbors).

Activities
Creighton's Law Review is published four times annually. Students are selected based on class standing or writing ability to work on the Law Review during their second and third years. The Creighton International and Comparative Law Journal (CICLJ) is an online publication, founded in 2010, that serves as a forum for debate and exploration of international law issues. It also provides students with the opportunity to refine their research, writing, and critical-thinking skills to create articles.

The Moot Court team at Creighton has received recognition for winning a number of regional and national competitions. The Black Law Students Association (BLSA), was selected as Creighton University's “Most Outstanding Graduate/Professional School Student Organization” for the 2017–18 academic year.

Employment 
According to Creighton's official 2017 ABA-required disclosures, nearly 88% of the Class of 2017 obtained full-time, long-term, JD-advantaged or JD-required employment nine months after graduation. Creighton's Law School Transparency under-employment score is 5%, indicating the percentage of the Class of 2017 unemployed, pursuing an additional degree, or working in a non-professional, short-term, or part-time job nine months after graduation.

Costs
Among top private Jesuit universities, Creighton is the least expensive institution for both tuition cost and cost of living. It is also among the lowest for average tuition rate increase in recent years. The total cost of attendance (indicating the cost of tuition, fees, and living expenses) at Creighton for the 2015–2016 academic year was $62,499.

Notable events
On a bi-annual basis, Supreme Court Justice Clarence Thomas co-teaches a course on constitutional law with professor G. Michael Fenner, JD. His most recent visit was in February 2019.

Once a year, the Nebraska Supreme Court holds session at Creighton University School of Law. The most recent session was in March 2019. The United States Court of Appeals for the Eighth Circuit heard oral arguments at the law school in November 2017.

The law school completed a $4.6 million renovation over the years 2015–2017.

A poverty law program was launched in 2017.

On June 20, 2011, the Omaha World-Herald reported that Creighton Law School was temporarily reducing its class size.

Notable alumni

 Laura Duffy, former United States Attorney for the Southern District of California
 Brad Ashford, former member of the Nebraska Legislature, former member of the United States House of Representatives
 Frank A. Barrett, former Governor of Wyoming
 Patrick Bourne, former member of the Nebraska Legislature
 John Joseph Cavanaugh III, former member of the United States House of Representatives
 Ernie Chambers, member of the Nebraska Legislature
 William M. Connolly, former Nebraska Supreme Court Justice
 Robert Vernon Denney, former member of the United States House of Representatives
 Mike Johanns, Member of the United States Senate, former Governor of Nebraska and former United States Secretary of Agriculture
 Steve Lathrop, former member of the Nebraska Legislature
 Ray Madden, former member of the United States House of Representatives
 Cheryl L. Mason — Chairman of the Board of Veterans' Appeals, US Department of Veterans’ Affairs (first woman appointed to the position)
 Francis P. Matthews, former United States Secretary of the Navy
 Michael McCormack, former Nebraska Supreme Court Justice
 John McKay, former United States Attorney
 Frederick Messmore, Justice of the Nebraska Supreme Court
 Henry Monsky, Omaha attorney
 Eugene O'Sullivan, former member of the United States House of Representatives
 Robert W. Pratt, District Judge for the United States District Court for the Southern District of Iowa
 Mike Reasoner, former member of the Iowa House of Representatives
Clair Roddewig, 14th Attorney General of South Dakota.
 Matt Schultz, Council Bluffs, Iowa City Council, former Iowa Secretary of State
 Robert L. Smith (1918–1999), Associate Justice of the Nebraska Supreme Court
 Lyle Elmer Strom, District Judge for the United States District Court for the District of Nebraska
 Doug Struyk, member of the Iowa House of Representatives
 Lee Terry, former member of the United States House of Representatives
Ginni Thomas, wife of Supreme Court Justice Clarence Thomas.

See also
 List of law schools in the United States

References

External links
 

Catholic law schools in the United States
Law
Educational institutions established in 1904
Law schools in Nebraska
1904 establishments in Nebraska